Xenos Books is a publishing company in Riverside, California that was founded in 1985 by Karl Kvitko and Verona Weiss. The company is known for publishing bilingual books, and modern American and foreign writers in translation.

Titles published

Poetry 
Sevastopol: On Photographs of War, by William Allen.
Naked as Water, by Mario Azzopardi, translated from Maltese, and with an Introduction & Afterword by Grazio Falzon.
The Hunts, by Amelia Biagioni, translated from Spanish by Renata Treitel.
Addictive Aversions, by Alfredo de Palchi, translated from Italian by Sonia Raiziss, et al.
Anonymous Constellation, by Alfredo de Palchi, translated from Italian by Sonia Raiziss.
The Scorpion’s Dark Dance, by Alfredo de Palchi, translated from Italian by Sonia Raiziss.
Angels of Youth, by Luigi Fontanella, translated from Italian by Carol Lettieri & Irena Marchegiani Jones.
The Wolf at the Door: A Poetic Cycle, by Bogomil Gjuzel, translated from Macedonian by P. H. Liotta; Introduction by Charles Simic.
The Poet is a Little God, by Vicente Huidobro, translated from Spanish by Jorge García-Gómez.
The Fantastic Ordinary World of Lutz Rathenow: Poems, Plays & Stories, by Lutz Rathenow, translated from German by Boria Sax & Imogen von Tannenberg.

Plays 
The Mad Kokoschka: A Play in Three Acts, by Gary Kern
Emergency Exit, by Manlio Santanelli, translated from Italian by Anthony Molino, with Jane House.

Fiction 
Animal World, by Antonio di Benedetto, translated from Spanish by H. E. Francis.
The Supervisor of the Sea, by Emil Draitser
The Last Summer, by Hugh Fox
Scarecrow & Other Anomalies, by Oliverio Girondo, translated from Spanish by Gilbert Alter-Gilbert.
Ave Eva: A Norwegian Tragedy, by Edvard Hoem, translated from the Nynorsk (New Norwegian) by Frankie Belle Shackelford.
When You Became She, by Imre Oravecz, translated from Hungarian by Bruce Berlind.
Jellyfish, by Giancarlo Pastore, translated from Italian and with an Afterword by Jamie Richards.
Kisses, Dreams & Other Infidels, by Antonio Porta, translated from Italian and with an Afterword by Anthony Molino.
Moon, Moon, Tell Me More, by Ellen Tifft
Blue Ride, by Ken Wilkerson

Nonfiction 
Fireplaces of Civilization: Literary Portraits of Florence, Paris, Sicily, Seville and Granada, by Jean-Pierre Barricelli
Cemeteries & Spaces of Death, ed. by Darnetta Bell & Kevin Bongiorni
Letters from Dwight, by Gary Kern
Genre at the Crossroads: The Challenge of Fantasy, ed. by George E. Slusser & Jean-Pierre Barricelli

References

External links
Xenos Books home page

Book publishing companies based in California
Companies based in Riverside, California
Mass media in Riverside, California
Publishing companies established in 1985
1985 establishments in California